William Joseph Gleeson (1893 – 18 November 1975) was an Irish hurler who played as a midfielder for the Limerick senior team.

Career 
Gleeson made his first appearance for the team during the 1915 championship and became a regular player over the next decade. During that time he won two All-Ireland winner's medals and three Munster winner's medals

At club level, Gleeson played with Fedamore and Young Irelands and won four county championship winners' medals in a career that spanned three decades.

Gleeson also won a Railway Cup winners' medal when he was chosen on the first two Munster inter-provincial teams and also represented Ireland in the Tailteann Games.

In retirement from playing Gleeson enjoyed a distinguished career as a referee while he was also a long-serving representative with the Munster Council.

References

1893 births
1975 deaths
Fedamore hurlers
Young Irelands (Limerick) hurlers
Limerick inter-county hurlers
Munster inter-provincial hurlers
Hurling referees
All-Ireland Senior Hurling Championship winners